Arthur Bernard Krock (November 16, 1886 – April 12, 1974) was a Pulitzer Prize winning American journalist. In a career spanning several decades covering the tenure of eleven United States presidents he became known as the "Dean of Washington newsmen".

Early life and career

Arthur Krock was born in Glasgow, Kentucky in 1887. He was the son of German-Jewish bookkeeper Joseph Krock and Caroline Morris, who was half-Jewish.  His mother became blind subsequent to his birth and Krock was raised by his grandparents, Emmanuel and Henrietta Morris until he was six years old. When his mother regained her sight, he joined his parents in Chicago, graduating from high school there in 1904.

Krock went on to Princeton University but dropped out in his first year owing to financial problems. He returned home, and in 1906 graduated with an associate degree from the Lewis Institute in Chicago.

Journalism

Krock began his career in journalism with the Louisville Herald, then went to Washington as a correspondent for the Louisville Times and Louisville Courier-Journal. In 1927, he joined The New York Times and soon became its Washington correspondent and bureau chief. His column, "In the Nation", was noted for its opinions on public policy.

For example, amid the Hiss–Chambers and Coplon spy cases and the investigation of David E. Lilienthal's management of the U.S. Atomic Energy Commission, Krock observed: The persons whose names have entered the trials and investigations, fairly and unfairly, include none who was affiliated with the Republican party ... The ideal solution from the standpoint of these strategists [President Truman's] would be: (1) the acquittal of Hiss ... (2) a find by the Joint Congressional Committee on Atomic Energy that Lilienthal has been a good manager ... (3) repudiation by public opinion of the more sensational testimony before the third Un-American Committee; (4) at least one substantial trial victory for the Department of Justice. This is a large order. But the deep-thinking Democratic politicos think there is a good chance for it.

Despite his stature, according to historian David Nasaw, from the earliest days of their friendship in Washington beginning in the mid-1930s, Krock became so staunch an advocate of Joseph P. Kennedy and his ambitions that he seemed to be all but in the pocket of the powerful millionaire (with one son who would later be U.S. president and two others who would contend for that office). Citing the correspondence between the two men in his authorized, yet highly researched and critically acclaimed, 2012 biography of Joe Kennedy, Professor Nasaw chronicles how it "reveals something quite disturbing, if not corrupt, about Krock's willingness to do Kennedy's bidding, to advise him or write a speech for him, then praise it in his column ..."

Less than two months before the assassination of Joe Kennedy's son, President John F. Kennedy, in his October 3, 1963 New York Times column titled "The Intra-Administration War in Vietnam", Krock quoted a high-ranking official in the government as saying: The CIA's growth was 'likened to a malignancy' which the 'very high official was not even sure the White House could control ... any longer.' 'If the United States ever experiences [an attempted coup to overthrow the Government] it will come from the CIA and not the Pentagon. The agency 'represents a tremendous power and total unaccountability to anyone.'

Awards
Over his 60-year career, Krock won three Pulitzer Prizes:
1935 Pulitzer Prize for Correspondence, for his Washington dispatches
1938 Prize for Correspondence, for "his exclusive authorized interview with the President of the United States on February 27, 1937."
1951 Special Citation of his exclusive interview with President Truman
The organization now explains the special Pulitzer thus: "The Advisory Board on the Pulitzer Prizes as a policy does not make any award to an individual member of the Board. In 1951, the Board decided that the outstanding instance of National Reporting done in 1950 was the exclusive interview with President Truman obtained by Arthur Krock of The New York Times, while Mr. Krock was a Board member. The Board therefore made no award in the National Reporting category."

He was awarded a French citation for his coverage of the Versailles Peace Conference.

On April 22, 1970, he was presented with the Presidential Medal of Freedom by President Richard Nixon.

Personal life
He was married twice, first to Marguerite Polleys, daughter of a Minneapolis railroad official, from 1911 to her death following a long illness in 1938. They had one son, Thomas, who, during the Spanish Civil War, was one of a handful of Americans who fought in the war on the side of Francisco Franco.  In 1939, he wed Martha Granger Blair of Chicago, a divorced society columnist for the Washington Times-Herald, who had two sons.

References

External links
 Arthur Krock Papers at the Mudd Manuscript Library, Princeton University

 Search Arthur Krock at The Pulitzer Prizes
 "Remarks on Presenting the Presidential Medal of Freedom to Eight Journalists" by Richard Nixon (April 22, 1970) at The American Presidency Project
 

 

1886 births
1974 deaths
American columnists
American newspaper reporters and correspondents
The New York Times Pulitzer Prize winners
Pulitzer Prize for Correspondence winners
Pulitzer Prize winners for journalism
People from Glasgow, Kentucky
Writers from Louisville, Kentucky
American people of German-Jewish descent
Presidential Medal of Freedom recipients